Sir Charles Philips Trevelyan, 3rd Baronet (28 October 1870 – 24 January 1958) was a British Liberal Party, and later Labour Party, politician and landowner. He served as President of the Board of Education in 1924 and between 1929 and 1931 in the first two Labour administrations of Ramsay MacDonald, the first Labour Prime Minister.

Background

Born into a liberal aristocratic family (see Trevelyan baronets of Nettlecombe, 1662), Charles was the eldest son of Sir George Trevelyan, 2nd Baronet, and his wife Caroline, daughter of Robert Needham Philips MP. He was the grandson of Sir Charles Trevelyan, 1st Baronet, the elder brother of R. C. Trevelyan and G. M. Trevelyan and the great-nephew of Lord Macaulay. He was the great-great grandson of Sir John Trevelyan, 4th Baronet (1735–1828). Family legend traced their ancestry to Sir Trevillian, one of King Arthur's knights, who swam ashore on horseback when Lyonesse sank. The family kept three houses year round: Wallington, which the family had owned since 1777, Welcombe House, and a town house in Westminster. The family estates comprised more than 11,000 acres.

After Harrow and Trinity College, Cambridge, Charles Philips Trevelyan decided upon a political career. Beatrice Webb, his friend, described him as "a man who has every endowment - social position, wealth, intelligence, an independent outlook, good looks, good manners".

Life and career
Trevelyan was first a Liberal and later a Labour MP. His eventual political achievements were uneven. As a member of the landed gentry serving in the Labour Party, he was considered by some to be a walking anachronism. Despite this, his own privileges and gentlemanly pursuits always remained intact. Trevelyan was elected Liberal Member of Parliament (MP) for Elland, Yorkshire, in a by-election in 1899. He served under H. H. Asquith as Parliamentary Secretary to the Board of Education between 1908 and 1914, when, as an opponent of British entry into the First World War, he resigned from the government. In 1914, also, he founded the Union of Democratic Control an all-party organisation rallying opposition to the war. In the 1918 general election he lost his Elland seat, running as an Independent Labour candidate.

He won Newcastle Central for Labour in 1922 and held it until 1931. He was a member of Ramsay MacDonald's Labour cabinets as President of the Board of Education between January and November 1924 and between 1929 and 1931, resigning when his Education Bill was rejected by the House of Lords a few months before the Labour government collapsed. The bill was opposed not only by Conservatives but by Catholic members of the Labour Party who feared that it would allow local governments to seize control of parochial schools, leading to a decline in Catholic support for the party in the 1930s. In 1924 he was sworn of the Privy Council. 

In early 1939, following Stafford Cripps and with Aneurin Bevan among others, Trevelyan was briefly expelled from the Labour Party for persisting with support for a "popular front" (involving co-operation with the Liberal Party and Communist Party) against the National Government.

Apart from his political career Trevelyan was also Lord Lieutenant of Northumberland between 1930 and 1949.

In 1942, although he had a son and heir, Trevelyan and his wife donated Wallington Hall, complete with its estate of farm land, which he had inherited in 1928, to the National Trust, the first donation of this kind.

He was the last surviving member of the first British Labour Cabinet.

Family
Trevelyan married Mary Katherine Bell, a younger half-sister of Gertrude Bell and the daughter of Sir Hugh Bell, 2nd Baronet. They had seven children including his eldest son, Sir George Trevelyan, whom he disinherited. He died in January 1958, aged 87.

References

Further reading
Morris, A. J. A. (1977) C. P. Trevelyan, 1870-1958: Portrait of a Radical. Belfast: Blackstaff Press

External links 
 

 

1870 births
1958 deaths
People educated at Harrow School
Alumni of Trinity College, Cambridge
Baronets in the Baronetage of the United Kingdom
British Secretaries of State for Education
Labour Party (UK) MPs for English constituencies
Liberal Party (UK) MPs for English constituencies
Lord-Lieutenants of Northumberland
Members of the Privy Council of the United Kingdom
UK MPs 1895–1900
UK MPs 1900–1906
UK MPs 1906–1910
UK MPs 1910
UK MPs 1910–1918
UK MPs 1922–1923
UK MPs 1923–1924
UK MPs 1924–1929
UK MPs 1929–1931
Members of the London School Board
Macaulay family of Lewis
Politicians affected by a party expulsion process